Mauricio Villeda Bermúdez (born April 27, 1948 in Tegucigalpa) is a Honduran attorney, leader of the Liberal Party of Honduras, and son of the late former president Ramón Villeda Morales. He ran unsuccessfully as a presidential candidate in the 2013 presidential elections.

References

1948 births
People from Tegucigalpa
Liberal Party of Honduras politicians
Living people
Candidates for President of Honduras
20th-century Honduran lawyers
20th-century Honduran politicians
21st-century Honduran lawyers
21st-century Honduran politicians